Jaroslav Mikoška (born 21 December 1933) is a Czech gymnast. He competed in eight events at the 1956 Summer Olympics.

References

1933 births
Living people
Czech male artistic gymnasts
Olympic gymnasts of Czechoslovakia
Gymnasts at the 1956 Summer Olympics
Sportspeople from Zlín